The National Premier Leagues Tasmania is an Australian semi-professional soccer league covering all regions of Tasmania. The league is a subdivision of the National Premier Leagues and commenced in 2013 with eight teams. Nationally the league sits below the A-League and above the Tasmanian regional championship competitions (with whom promotion and relegation will exist from the 2019 season onwards).

History

Prior to the NPL Tasmania the previous statewide league encompassing teams from all-over Tasmania had not taken place since 1999.  The highest level of soccer being played in Tasmania was in two regional leagues in the North and South of the state.

The league was formed in 2012 by Football Federation Tasmania and the first season commenced in 2013.  FFT referred to the league as the T-League during planning prior to the establishment of the league.  Between 2012–2014 the league was known as the Victory League due to sponsorship by A-League club Melbourne Victory.  In 2015 the league was officially known as the PS4 Victory League also for sponsorship reasons.  In 2016, the league changed names again to National Premier Leagues Tasmania in line with other divisions within the NPL.

The initial clubs were awarded licences for league membership for three seasons between 2013–2015.  In 2015 the FFT Board analysed the clubs on and off pitch.  Based on this analysis six of the eight clubs in the NPL Tasmania were offered licences for an additional three seasons between 2016–2018. Glenorchy Knights and Launceston City were required to reapply for membership and compete with other clubs for the final two positions in the league in 2016.  Riverside Olympic, University, Clarence and New Town Eagles also applied for the two positions in addition to Glenorchy and Launceston City.  In August 2015 it was announced that Clarence United and Launceston City had been awarded the available licences between 2016–18.

Up until 2017, the top teams in the league also qualified for a Tasmanian end of season finals series.  Between 2013–15 the winner of the local finals series was awarded the Victory Cup.  In 2013 and 2014 the top four teams participated in the finals series.  In 2015 the finals series has been expanded to include the top six teams in the league as well as the champions of the Northern Championship and Southern Championship.  In 2016, the end of season finals series cup was renamed the League Cup due to lapsing sponsorship arrangements, and scrapped entirely after the end of the 2017 season.

In 2019, the league expanded to nine teams.  However, following the season, two clubs amalgamated bringing the league back to eight teams.

Format
In late 2016, FFT announced they will expand the league to ten teams and introduce a promotion/relegation system.  The winner of the 2018 Southern and Northern Championships were promoted into NPL Tasmania and to have the competition with ten teams for 2019, however Northern Rangers withdrew from the league leaving nine clubs.  From the end of the 2019 season the winners of the Northern and Southern Championships will play-off against each other with the winner then automatically replacing the last placed finisher in the NPL Tasmania whilst the loser of the Northern and Southern Championships Play-off will play an additional play-off for a place in the NPL Tasmania in the following season against the second last NPL Tasmania club. After 2019, two clubs merged lowering the league back to eight clubs.

The goal of the league is to consist of ten clubs geographically spread throughout Tasmania (although currently there are eight).  The team on top of the table is considered the league champion and qualifies to play in the National Premier Leagues finals series against the champions of the other states.

Clubs

2022 clubs

Honours

Honours (before the NPL)

Records
Most League titles: 4, Devonport City
Most points in a season: 62, Devonport City, 2019 season
Most wins in a season: 20, Devonport City, 2019 season
Most goals scored in a season: 91, Devonport City, 2019 season
Most consecutive wins in a season: 13, South Hobart, 2017 season
Biggest win: Olympia Warriors 14 – 0 Glenorchy Knights, 21 June 2015
Highest scoring game: Olympia Warriors 14 – 0 Glenorchy Knights, 21 June 2015

All time table
Updated as of end of 2022 season

Top scorers

Notes

References 

 

Summer association football leagues
1
National Premier Leagues
Sports leagues established in 2012
2012 establishments in Australia
Recurring sporting events established in 2012